Zinc finger protein 19 is a protein that in humans is encoded by the ZNF19 gene.

The protein encoded by this gene contains a zinc finger, a nucleic acid-binding domain present in many transcription factors. This gene is located in a region next to ZNF23, a gene also encoding a zinc finger protein, on chromosome 16.

References

Further reading

External links 
 

Transcription factors